USS New National was a large side wheel steamer seized by the Union Navy during the American Civil War. She was used by the Union Navy as a troop ship and receiving ship in support of the Union Navy blockade of Confederate waterways.

New National seized by the Union Navy at Memphis 

New National, a wooden side-wheel steamer, was seized by Union Navy gunboats at Memphis, Tennessee, 6 June 1862, after they had destroyed the Confederate River Defense Fleet.

Placed into Union service as a troop ship 

Placed in service as a transport, First Master A. M. Grant in command, for the U.S. War Department's Western Flotilla, New National carried troops in a joint expedition to St. Charles, Arkansas, where they landed 17 June, stormed Southern earthworks, and won control of the White River for the Union fleet.

Officially transferred to the Navy as a receiving ship 

Transferred from the War Department to the Navy 30 September 1862, New National served as a receiving ship and as a mail and supply boat for the Mississippi Squadron.

Returned to owner and chartered by the Union Navy 

Returned to her owner, Pearson Montgomery, at the intervention of U.S. Secretary of the Treasury Salmon P. Chase, 21 March 1863, she was simultaneously chartered by the Navy and kept in service.

Supporting the capture of Yazoo City 

After the fall of Vicksburg, she participated in the expedition which captured Yazoo City, Mississippi, 13 July 1863.

Decommissioning post-war, and return to owner 

Following service maintaining Union communication and supply lines on the Mississippi River and its tributaries through the end of the Civil War, New National decommissioned at Mound City, Illinois, 12 April 1865 and was returned to her owner.

See also 

Confederate States Navy
Anaconda Plan

References 

Ships of the Union Navy
Steamships of the United States Navy
Transports of the United States Navy
American Civil War auxiliary ships of the United States
1862 ships